The Tombstones of Ahlat in Turkey  are famous for their dimensions and design.

Ahlat is a ilçe (district) center in Bitlis Province at the Lake Van shore.

The history of the city dates back to 900 BC, the Urartu era but the tombstones are from the medieval age. Although the tombstones are known as Seljukid era, according to the governorship of Ahlat they belong to the era of the Shah-Armens, Ayyubid dynasty, the Mongol and the Safavid eras. These  periods correspond to the 12th-15th centuries. The most important tombstones are in the cemeteries known as Harabe şehir cemetery, Taht'ı Suleyman cemetery, Kırklar cemetery, Kale cemetery, Merkez cemetery and Meydanlık cemetery. Among these, only the Kale cemetery has Ottoman tombs .

World Heritage Status
This site was added to the UNESCO World Heritage Tentative List on February 25, 2000, in the Cultural category.

References

Bitlis Province
History of Bitlis Province
Ahlat
Cemeteries in Turkey
World Heritage Tentative List for Turkey